Stuttgart is an unincorporated community in Phillips County, Kansas, United States.  As of the 2020 census, the population of the community and nearby areas was 44.  It lies in northern Kansas at U.S. Route 36 between Prairie View and Phillipsburg.

History
It was established by settlers in the early 1870s and grew to have two Lutheran churches, a public school, hotel, cafe, bank, cinema, hairdresser, wood yard, grocer's shop, railway depot, grain silo, repair shop, blacksmith, dairy, and more.  It was founded on February 6, 1888. A post office was opened in Stuttgart in 1888, and remained in operation for until it closed in 1986.

Today there is a Lutheran church, grain elevator, garage, and a gas station.

Demographics

For statistical purposes, the United States Census Bureau has defined this community as a census-designated place (CDP).

References

Further reading

External links
 German site about Stuttgart
 Phillips County Kansas
 Phillips County maps: Current, Historic, KDOT

Unincorporated communities in Phillips County, Kansas
Unincorporated communities in Kansas
Populated places established in 1888